The Madhya Pradesh Vidhan Sabha or the Madhya Pradesh Legislative Assembly is the unicameral state legislature of Madhya Pradesh state in India.

The seat of the Vidhan Sabha is at Bhopal, the capital of the state. It is housed in the Vidhan Bhavan, an imposing building located at the center of the Capital Complex in the Arera Hill locality of Bhopal city. The term of the Vidhan Sabha is five years, unless dissolved earlier. Presently, it comprises 230 members who are directly elected from single-seat constituencies.



History of constituencies of Madhya Pradesh 
The history of the Madhya Pradesh Vidhan Sabha constituencies can be traced to 1935, when the Government of India Act 1935 provided for the first elected legislature of the Central Provinces, the Central Provinces Legislative Assembly. The first elections for which were held in 1937.

After the Indian independence in 1947, the erstwhile province of the Central Provinces and Berar along with a number of princely states merged with the Indian Union, became a new state, Madhya Pradesh. The number of constituencies of the legislative assembly of this state was 184. 127 constituencies were single member and 48 constituencies were double member. 9 constituencies were reserved for the candidates belonging to the Scheduled tribes.

The present-day Madhya Pradesh state came into existence on 1 November 1956 following the reorganization of states. It was created by merging the erstwhile Madhya Pradesh (without the Marathi speaking areas, which were merged with Bombay state), Madhya Bharat, Vindhya Pradesh and Bhopal states. The number of constituencies of the legislative assemblies of Madhya Bharat, Vindhya Pradesh and Bhopal were 79, 48 and 23 respectively. On 1 November 1956 the legislative assemblies of all four erstwhile states were also merged to form the reorganized Madhya Pradesh Vidhan Sabha. The tenure of this first Vidhan Sabha was very short, it was dissolved on 5 March 1957.

The first election to the re-organized Madhya Pradesh Vidhan Sabha were held in 1957 and the second Vidhan Sabha was constituted on 1 April 1957.

List of constituencies
Following is the list of the constituencies of the Madhya Pradesh Vidhan Sabha since the delimitation of legislative assembly constituencies in 2008. At present, 35 constituencies are reserved for the candidates belonging to the Scheduled castes and 47 are reserved for the candidates belonging to the Scheduled tribes:

References

Vidhan Sabha
Madhya Pradesh